Alpha Nelson Sissoko (born 7 March 1997) is a French professional footballer who plays as a right-back for  club Quevilly-Rouen.

Club career
Sissoko made his professional debut for Clermont in a Ligue 2 2–0 win over Châteauroux on 19 September 2017.

On 30 January 2022, Sissoko signed with Quevilly-Rouen until the end of the season.

Personal life
Born in France, Sissoko is of Malian descent.

References

External links
 
 
 

1997 births
Living people
Sportspeople from Bondy
Association football defenders
French footballers
French people of Malian descent
Clermont Foot players
AS Saint-Étienne players
Le Puy Foot 43 Auvergne players
US Quevilly-Rouen Métropole players
Ligue 2 players
Ligue 1 players
Championnat National players
Championnat National 2 players
Championnat National 3 players
Footballers from Seine-Saint-Denis